The 2015 Ukrainian Football Amateur League season was scheduled to start on April 22, 2015.

Teams
 Debut: FC Opir Lviv, FC Mal Korosten, FC Kolos Zachepylivka, FC Zhemchuzhyna Odesa, FC Tavriya-Skif Rozdol
 Newly admitted former professional clubs: FC Avanhard Kakhovka

Withdrawn
List of clubs that took part in last year competition, but chose not to participate in 2015 season.
 FC Mayak Sarny
 FC Podillya Khmelnytskyi
 FC Lehion Zhytomyr
 FC Retro Vatutine
 FC Zoria Bilozirya
 FC Torpedo Mykolaiv
 FC Varvarivka Mykolaiv
 FC Elektrovazhmash Kharkiv
 FC Olimpik Kirovohrad
 FC Burevisnyk Petrove
 USC-Rubin Donetsk

Locations

First stage

Group 1

Top goalscorers

Group 2

Top goalscorers

Group 3

Top goalscorers

Group 4

Top goalscorers

Second stage

Group A

Top goalscorers

Group B

Top goalscorers

Notes: 
 On June 19 FC Myr Hornostayivka withdrew from the league after playing one game at the second stage. The Association of Amateur Football of Ukraine (AAFU) expressed its concern over such unconsidered step. The club was replaced with FC Avanhard Kakhovka.
 Inhulets Petrove will continue participate in the finals with its second team Inhulets-2 Petrove.

Finals
The finals were decided to take place in the Odessa Oblast. Teams of Group A will play in the city of Odessa (Ivan Stadium and Chornomorets Training Base), while teams of Group B will play in Sarata Raion, the village of Zorya (Tropanets Stadium) and the town of Sarata (Sport Complex).

Group A

Top goalscorers

Group B

Top goalscorers

Notes:
 Game ODEK – Inhulets-2 finished 1:0, however later the result was annulled and Inhulets received a technical victory as ODEK fielded a player who was not supposed to play due to the number of yellow cards he received.

Final game

Promotion
On 11 November 2015 for licensing to play in the 2016–17 Ukrainian Second League applied 14 clubs including FC Balkany Zorya, FC Vinnytsia, FC Nyva Vinnytsia, FC Nika Ivano-Frankivsk, FC Ivano-Frankivsk, FC Kobra Sumy, FC Elektron Romny, FC Lviv, FC Rukh Vynnyky, FC Ahro Pidvolochysk, FC Kryvbas Kryvyi Rih, FC Polissya Zhytomyr, FC Rosso Nero Zaporizhia, FC Podillya Khmelnytskyi.

See also
 2015 Ukrainian Amateur Cup

References

Ukrainian Football Amateur League seasons
4
4
Uk
Uk